The 2016 United States Senate election in Maryland took place on November 8, 2016, to elect a member of the United States Senate to represent the State of Maryland, concurrently with the 2016 U.S. presidential election, as well as other elections to the United States Senate in other states and elections to the United States House of Representatives and various state and local elections.

Incumbent Democratic Senator Barbara Mikulski decided to retire after five terms in the Senate. Primary elections were held April 26, 2016, in which Chris Van Hollen and Kathy Szeliga were chosen as the Democratic and Republican party nominees, respectively. In addition, the Green Party chose Margaret Flowers and the Libertarian Party chose Arvin Vohra as their respective nominees.

Van Hollen was heavily favored to win the election. He ultimately won with over 60% of the vote. As typically occurs with the state's elections, most support for the Democratic nominee, Van Hollen, came from the densely populated Baltimore–Washington metropolitan area in central Maryland, while the Republican nominee, Szeliga, did well in the more sparsely populated areas on the Eastern Shore and in Western Maryland, and narrowly won Anne Arundel County, home to the state capital Annapolis, as well as exurban Frederick County.

As of 2022, this is the most recent statewide election in Maryland that a Democrat won without carrying Anne Arundel or Frederick counties.

Background 
Mikulski first ran for the U.S. Senate in 1974, losing to Republican incumbent Charles Mathias. Mikulski then served in the U.S. House of Representatives from 1977 to 1987 and was elected to the U.S. Senate in 1986, succeeding the retiring Mathias. She was re-elected by large margins in 1992, 1998, 2004 and 2010. Shortly after being sworn in for her fifth term in 2011, she succeeded Margaret Chase Smith as the longest-serving female senator in U.S. history, and on March 17, 2012, she became the longest-serving female member of Congress in U.S. history, surpassing Congresswoman Edith Nourse Rogers of Massachusetts, who served from 1925 to 1960. On March 2, 2015, Mikulski announced that she would not run for re-election to a sixth term in office.

In August 2013, Abby Livingston of Roll Call had predicted that a potential retirement by Mikulski would create "chaos" and "blow open Maryland's political bottleneck" because "the state's teeming political Democratic Party talent is backed up in lower offices." Among the ten Democrats who ran in the primary, only two had previously been elected to an office.

Democratic primary

Candidates

Declared 
 Donna Edwards, U.S. Representative
 Freddy Donald Dickson Jr.
 Ralph Jaffe, perennial candidate
 Theresa Scaldaferri
 Charles U. Smith, perennial candidate
 Violet Staley
 Blaine Taylor
 Ed Tinus, perennial candidate
 Chris Van Hollen, U.S. Representative
 Lih Young, perennial candidate

Declined 
 Rushern Baker, Prince George's County Executive (endorsed Chris Van Hollen)
 Anthony Brown, former Lieutenant Governor of Maryland and nominee for Governor of Maryland in 2014 (ran for MD-04)
 Susan L. Burke, attorney
 Elijah Cummings, U.S. Representative (ran for re-election)
 John Delaney, U.S. Representative (ran for re-election)
 Peter Franchot, Comptroller of Maryland
 Doug Gansler, former Attorney General of Maryland and candidate for Governor of Maryland in 2014
 Steny Hoyer, U.S. Representative and House Minority Whip (ran for re-election)
 Kevin Kamenetz, Baltimore County Executive
 Kathleen Kennedy Townsend, former lieutenant governor of Maryland, nominee for governor in 2002 and nominee for Maryland's 2nd congressional district in 1986
 Barbara Mikulski, incumbent senator
 Heather Mizeur, former state delegate and candidate for governor in 2014
 Martin O'Malley, former governor of Maryland (ran for President)
 Thomas Perez, United States Secretary of Labor and former secretary of the Maryland Department of Labor, Licensing and Regulation
 Jamie Raskin, state senator (ran for MD-08)
 Stephanie Rawlings-Blake, Mayor of Baltimore
 Dutch Ruppersberger, U.S. Representative (ran for re-election)
 John Sarbanes, U.S. Representative and son of former U.S. Senator Paul Sarbanes (ran for re-election)
 Kenneth Ulman, former Howard County Executive and nominee for lieutenant governor in 2014
 Benjamin Jealous, former president and CEO of the NAACP
 Frank Kratovil, former U.S. Representative
 Kweisi Mfume, former U.S. Representative, former president and CEO of the NAACP and candidate for the U.S. Senate in 2006

Debates

Endorsements

Polling

Results

Republican primary

Candidates

Declared 
 Chris Chaffee, candidate for MD-05 in 2010 and nominee for MD-05 in 2014
 Sean P. Connor
 Richard Douglas, attorney, former Deputy Assistant Secretary of Defense and candidate for the U.S. Senate in 2012
 John Graziani, candidate for MD-04 in 2014
 Greg Holmes, candidate for MD-04 in 2012 and 2014 and Democratic state senate candidate in 2006
 Joseph Hooe, small business owner
 Chrys Kefalas, vice president of executive communications for the National Association of Manufacturers and deputy legal counsel under Governor Bob Ehrlich
 Mark McNicholas
 Lynn Richardson
 Anthony Seda
 Richard Shawver, candidate for U.S. Senate in 2006
 Kathy Szeliga, state delegate and House Minority Whip
 Dave Wallace, businessman and nominee for MD-08 in 2014
 Garry Thomas Yarrington

Declined 
 Kendel Ehrlich, former First Lady of Maryland
 Jeannie Haddaway-Riccio, former state delegate and candidate for lieutenant governor in 2014
 Mary Kane, former Secretary of State of Maryland and nominee for lieutenant governor in 2010
 Allan Kittleman, Howard County Executive
 Connie Morella, former U.S. Representative and former United States Ambassador to the Organisation for Economic Co-operation and Development
 Laura Neuman, former Anne Arundel County Executive
 Boyd Rutherford, Lieutenant Governor of Maryland
 Michael Steele, former lieutenant governor of Maryland, former chairman of the Republican National Committee and nominee for the U.S. Senate in 2006
 Dan Bongino, former United States Secret Service agent, nominee for the U.S. Senate in 2012 and nominee for Maryland's 6th congressional district in 2014 (moved to Florida)
 Ben Carson, author and retired director of pediatric neurosurgery at Johns Hopkins Hospital (running for President)
 Robert Ehrlich, former governor of Maryland
 Barry Glassman, Harford County Executive
 Andy Harris, U.S. Representative (running for re-election)
 Larry Hogan, Governor of Maryland
 Steve Schuh, Anne Arundel County Executive

Endorsements

Polling

Results 

Szeliga won the April 26, 2016, primary in Baltimore City and each of Maryland's counties except Calvert, St. Mary's, Charles, and Prince George's, in which Chris Chaffee received more votes.

Third party and independent candidates

Green Party 
 Margaret Flowers, former pediatrician, healthcare activist and radio host

Results

Independents 
 Greg Dorsey
 Steve Gladstone
 Edward Shlikas
 Kay Young

Libertarian Party 
 Arvin Vohra, nominee for MD-05 in 2012 and for MD-04 in 2014

General election

Candidates 
 Margaret Flowers, (G) former pediatrician, healthcare activist and radio host
 Kathy Szeliga, (R) state delegate and House Minority Whip
 Chris Van Hollen, (D) U.S. Representative
 Arvin Vohra, (L) nominee for MD-05 in 2012 and for MD-04 in 2014

Debates

Endorsements

Predictions

Polling

Results

By county

References

External links 
Official campaign websites (Archived) 
 Chris Van Hollen (D) for Senate
 Kathy Szeliga (R) for Senate
 Margaret Flowers (G) for Senate
 Arvin Vohra (L) for Senate

2016
Maryland
United States Senate